Donnell Ballagh O'Cahan (died 1627) was an Irish landowner in Ulster. A vassal of Hugh O'Neill, Earl of Tyrone, O'Cahan was frequently in rebellion alongside his lord in the closing years of the 16th century. Although he did not go into exile with Tyrone, he claimed to have been betrayed by the English Crown, which he accused of failing to keep to an agreement over a large grant of lands. Arrested for treason, he was never brought to trial but was held captive in Dublin Castle until his death sometime around 1627.

Life and career
O'Cahan was a major Ulster landholder and has been described as "the last in a long line of chieftains" ruling the area between the River Bann in Belfast to the River Foyle in Derry, which he held off the O'Neill Earls of Tyrone as their liegeman (ur ri—or under king—in gaelic). His main property was in Dungiven. He also held Limavady. He spent much of the 1590s in armed rebellion with Tyrone against the crown; his lands were "viciously ravaged" by Docwra until O'Cahan surrendered in 160s. About a third of O'Cahan's lands in Londonderry were granted to Hugh O'Neill, Earl of Tyrone, who was also O'Cahan's father-on-law.

O'Cahan and the Flight of the Earls
In September 1607 Tyrone and other earls fled the country; the same month, O'Cahan was knighted.

In early 1608, O'Cahan's brother joined the rebellion of Cahir O'Doherty, and although O'Cahan was not officially implicated, he was suspected of having knowledge of the uprising. He was arrested but never tried. The antiquarian Francis Joseph Bigger has suggested that he was rumoured to have attempted flight with Tyrone and the other rebel lords, and had only been prevented from doing so by an "accidental delay in crossing some ferry on the road". In the vent, O'Cahan remained in Limavady Castle following Tyrone's flight. Sir Arthur Chichester—the Crown's Lord Deputy in Ulster—reasoned, says Bigger, that this indicated not only his sympathy for the rebels but mens rea also. This was compounded by the fact that, in English eyes, O'Cahan "had become troublesome, and almost unmanageable of late, so, everything considered, it was thought best to take him also into special keeping at Dublin Castle". Bigger notes that, although O'Cahan had remained loyal to his liege lord throughout the latter's seven-year campaign at the Crown, in 1608 he joined the major English statesman and commander in Ireland, Henry Docwra, on condition that O'Cahan would receive sufficient grants and lands to enable him to establish himself independently of Tyrone, and would no longer hold his estates in fief.

Downfall and death
O'Cahan's arrangement with Docwra regarding his lands was agreed to by the government, but Chichester managed to persuade the government to repudiate the deal. O'Cahan, says Bigger, went "frantic": his behaviour allowed Chichester to claim that O'Cahan had spoken and acted treasonably. O'Cahan spent the rest of his life imprisoned in the Tower of London, dying there around 1626. During his imprisonment, the Plantation of Ulster continued westwards. However, his legal title to the Bann−Foyle region was not contested and, even though O'Cahan was never to return, no individual planter ever laid claim to his estate.

References

Bibliography
 
 
 
 
 
 
 

Flight of the Earls
People of Elizabethan Ireland
1626 deaths
16th-century Irish people
17th-century Irish people